Marko Pršić (born 13 September 1990), is a Serbian futsal player who plays for Ekonomac and the Serbia national futsal team.

References

External links
UEFA profile

1990 births
Living people
Futsal forwards
Serbian men's futsal players